Damlanci (Damlawa, Damla) is a Southern Bantoid Jarawan language of Nigeria. It was reported by Roger Blench (2019), but is not reported in Ethnologue or Glottolog. Speakers are over age 50, located in Maccido village, Alkaleri LGA, Bauchi State.

References

Jarawan languages
Languages of Nigeria